Josia ligula is a moth of the  family Notodontidae. It is found in South America, on the lowlands of the Amazon basin, the Guiana shield, and the Atlantic coastal forest of Brazil.

External links
Species page at Tree of Life project

Notodontidae of South America
Moths described in 1806